Kaniashir is a village in the Alagyaz Municipality of the Aragatsotn Province of Armenia. The village is mostly populated by Yezidis.

References

Populated places in Aragatsotn Province
Yazidi populated places in Armenia